Don't Make Waves is a 1967 American sex comedy (with elements of the beach party genre) starring Tony Curtis, Claudia Cardinale, Dave Draper and Sharon Tate. Distributed by Metro-Goldwyn-Mayer, the film was directed by Alexander Mackendrick and is based on the 1959 novel Muscle Beach, by Ira Wallach, who also co-wrote the screenplay.

The film depicts a series of romantic triangles between different groupings of the principal cast and supporting players among several backdrops involving Southern California culture (swimming pools, bodybuilding, beach life, fantastic real estate, mudslides, metaphysical gurus, etc.).

Plot
Carlo Cofield, a tourist visiting California's west coast, has not even arranged lodging, when his car is smashed by a reckless driver. She is a carefree, attractive Italian artist named Laura Califatti, who offers her couch for Carlo to sleep on that night.

This arrangement displeases Rod Prescott, a wealthy swimming-pool builder, because Laura is his mistress. After being kicked out of Laura's, Carlo tries to sleep on the beach and nearly drowns. He wakes up to find a gorgeous surfer, many years his junior, rescuing him by covering his nostrils with her cheek to administer two breaths. She goes by the name "Malibu." Carlo begins a romantic pursuit of Malibu.

After renting a house near the ocean, Carlo cons a sweet but naïve bodybuilder, Harry, Malibu's boyfriend, into believing that having sex is harmful to his body. He also bribes a phony psychic, "Madame Lavinia," who is actually a man, to discourage Harry from seeing Malibu any more.

Rod decides to give the persistent Carlo a job as a pool salesman. The affair with Laura is discovered by Rod's wife, Diane, who demands a divorce. As a quarrel develops with everyone present, a mudslide caused by a sudden storm makes Carlo's house slide down a cliff. By the time everyone is saved, they pair off with the romantic partners they deserve.

Cast

Production notes
The film was based on Ira Wallach's novel Muscle Beach which was published in 1959.

In August 1963 it was announced film rights had been purchased by Martin Ransohoff of Filmways, who had a deal with MGM. Ransohoff and Wallach had collaborated on The Wheeler Dealers. Wallach would do the screenplay and the film would be part of an $18 million slate, coming out in June 1964. Filming was delayed.

Curtis' casting was announced in April 1966. In June it was announced Alexander Mackendrick would direct and Claudia Cardinale would co star. 
Filming took place in August 1966.

Sharon Tate told her husband Roman Polanski that her experience working on this film was not particularly enjoyable. The production atmosphere was tense, and it was worsened when an uncredited stuntman drowned when he parachuted into the Pacific Ocean. The film was Tate's third to be produced, but as it was the first to be released in cinemas, it is generally considered to be her debut. MGM mounted an extensive publicity campaign upon its release that was based largely on Tate and her character, Malibu, and life-sized cardboard cutouts of Tate wearing a bikini were placed in cinema foyers throughout the United States. It was also linked to a widespread advertising campaign by Coppertone which also featured Tate.

Dave Draper, who plays Malibu's boyfriend Harry, was the 1965 IFBB Mr. America and the 1966 NABBA Mr. Universe.

1966 NABBA Mr. Universe bodybuilder Chester Yorton, who plays Ted Gunder, made one other film, 1964's Muscle Beach Party, in which he plays the character called "Hulk."

Music
The score was composed by Vic Mizzy.  Roger McGuinn and Chris Hillman wrote the title song, "Don't Make Waves," performed by the Byrds over the opening credits.

Bob Buquor 
The aerial parachuting sequences in "Don't Make Waves" were photographed by freefall cinematographer Bob Buquor. Bob was one of the earliest camera-flyers the sport of skydiving produced in the early 1960s. ABC's Wide World Of Sports hired Bob as a freefall cameraman to cover the World Championships of Parachuting in Munich, Germany in 1964. He is a legend to skydivers the world over, with one of the most prestigious awards in skydiving being the "Bob Buquor Memorial Star Crest" Award, so-named in his honor.

No-one knows exactly what happened to Bob, but it is likely winds aloft prevented him from reaching the beach landing zone once under his open round Para-Commander  parachute. Instead, he landed in the Pacific Ocean off Malibu, California and drowned. Rescue divers later found Bob sitting upright on the ocean floor with his camera helmet off, but tightly clutched in his arms. The consensus of people who knew Bob is that he might have saved himself by jettisoning his heavy camera helmet, but he was too much of a professional to not bring back the images he was paid to capture. The film he exposed in the sky above was salvaged from his camera and included in the aerial scenes you see in the movie. Bob Buquor's name does not appear anywhere in the credits for the film, and he is only mentioned by one of the film's co-stars Sharon Tate as an "Uncredited stunt man who drowned in the Pacific Ocean". Bob was posthumously inducted into the Skydiving Hall of Fame in 2012. When Bob Buquor died on July 27th 1966, he was 33 years old and had been jumping for eight years making 990 jumps.

Critical reception
Upon its release on June 20, 1967, Don't Make Waves received generally mixed reviews. By the time the film was released, the popularity of beach films and films that related to California beach culture had begun to wane as had the popularity of Tony Curtis as a matinee idol. Film critic Andrew Sarris' contemporary review in The Village Voice reported that the film was "one of the more underrated comedies of the season," but added "[the film] is the latest of what promises to be a long line of frightening documentaries on the state of California" and "the biggest liability, however, is Claudia Cardinale, who should never act in English." Dave Kehr wrote in Chicago Reader that the film had a "remarkable tone" of "sharp but warmhearted social satire." Writing for Turner Classic Movies, critic Jeff Stafford described the film as "often surprisingly funny and full of incidental pleasures [...] Curtis is perfectly cast as the shyster pool salesman," and "the sight gags are also occasionally inspired." Don't Make Waves also received a positive review from film critic Leonard Maltin who described it as "a gem", and noted the "good direction, funny performance by Sharon Tate and a catchy title song...".

In American Prince, his 2009 autobiography, Tony Curtis wrote of making Don't Make Waves, "The plot was utterly ridiculous, but I agreed to appear in the film because I got a percentage of the gross." The film went on to earn $1.25 million at the box office.

Home media
Don't Make Waves was released to DVD by Warner Home Video's Warner Archive on June 27, 2011 as a burn-on-demand Region 1 widescreen DVD.

See also
 List of American films of 1967

References

External links
 
 
 
 
 Review of Don't Make Waves at TVGuide.com

1967 films
1960s sex comedy films
American satirical films
American sex comedy films
1960s English-language films
Films based on American novels
Films directed by Alexander Mackendrick
Films scored by Vic Mizzy
Films set in Malibu, California
Films shot in California
Films shot in South Carolina
Metro-Goldwyn-Mayer films
Beach party films
Filmways films
1967 comedy films
1960s American films